The 1997 Eurocard Open, also known as the Stuttgart Masters, was a men's tennis tournament played on indoor hard courts. It was the 2nd edition of the Stuttgart Masters, and was part of the ATP Super 9 of the 1997 ATP Tour. It took place at the Schleyerhalle in Stuttgart, Germany, from 20 October through 27 October 1997.

The singles field was led by first-seeded Pete Sampras. Other top seeds were Michael Chang, Patrick Rafter and Goran Ivanišević. Petr Korda, seeded 15th,  won the singles title.

Finals

Singles

 Petr Korda defeated  Richard Krajicek 7–6(8–6), 6–2, 6–4, 
It was Korda's 1st title of the year and his 8th overall. It was his 1st Super 9 title of the year, and overall.

Doubles

 Todd Woodbridge /  Mark Woodforde defeated  Rick Leach /  Jonathan Stark 6–3, 6–3

References

External links
 ITF tournament edition details

 
Eurocard Open